In mathematics, in the topology of 3-manifolds, the sphere theorem of  gives conditions for elements of the second homotopy group of a 3-manifold to be represented by embedded spheres.

One example is the following:

Let  be an orientable 3-manifold such that  is not the trivial group.  Then there exists a non-zero element of  having a representative that is an embedding .

The proof of this version of the theorem can be based on transversality methods, see .

Another more general version (also called the projective plane theorem, and due to David B. A. Epstein) is:

,
,
 is a covering map, and 
 

References

 

 

 

 

 

Geometric topology
3-manifolds
Theorems in topology